The 1957 World Table Tennis Championships – Corbillon Cup (women's team) was the 17th edition of the women's team championship. 

Japan won the gold medal, Romania won the silver medal and China won the bronze medal.

Medalists

Final tables

Group 1

Group 2

Group 3

Final Group

Final Group Matches

See also
List of World Table Tennis Championships medalists

References

-
1957 in women's table tennis